John Watmuff (16 September 1915 – 10 August 1972) was an Australian cricketer. He played two first-class cricket matches for Victoria between 1935 and 1936.

See also
 List of Victoria first-class cricketers

References

External links
 

1915 births
1972 deaths
Australian cricketers
Victoria cricketers
Cricketers from Melbourne